Andrenosoma fulvicaudum is a species of robber fly in the family Asilidae. It was first formally named as Laphria fulvicauda by Thomas Say in 1823. The type specimen was from Missouri, but was lost.

Description
Andrenosoma fulvicaudum reaches  in length.

The head is covered with white hair. Mustache (mystax) black, stout bristles. Some black bristles around antenna base.

The antennae are black and short with 3 joints.

The thorax is black and gray with two wide black stripes down the center. The thorax sides (pleura) have long, white hair. Segment 2 (scutellum) is small with black bristles.

Wings: Dark, blackish. Veins smudged brownish.  

Legs: Black with long white hair. Feet have shorter black bristles. Toes yellow.

Abdomen: Blue-black on 1st 4 segments, covered with long white hair on sides. Last 3 (sometimes 4) segments reddish-brown. Female ovipositor pointed, brownish.

Habitat
Andrena fulvicaudum occurs in dry, sandy locations with trees. It rests on logs, trunks, and stumps in sunlight.

Biology
It eats bees and wasps; in one report it ate wood boring beetles. It flies in July and August.

Adults are found on tree trunks. Larvae and pupa have been collected under oak log bark in cells of the buprestid Chrysobothris femorata.

References

Journal of the Academy of Natural Sciences of Philadelphia, 1823, Vol. 3 by Say, pg. 53.
Transactions of the American Entomological Society, 1884, Vol. 11 by Williston, pg. 33.
Proceedings of the Entomological Society of Philadelphia, 1864, Vol. 3 by Walsh, pg. 242.
Transactions of the American Entomological Society, 1907, Vol. 33 by Jones, pp. 281–282.
Bulletin of the American Museum of Natural History, 1911, Vol. 32 by Johnson, pg. 61.
Ohio State University, 1934: Thesis Asilidae by Bromley, pp. 305–310.
The Great Lakes Entomologist, 1975, Vol. 8 #2 by Baker & Fischer, pg. 37.

fulvicaudum
Articles created by Qbugbot
Insects described in 1823